WHYY may refer to:

 WHYY-TV, a television station (channel 13, virtual 12) licensed to Wilmington, Delaware, United States
 WHYY-FM, a radio station (90.9 FM) licensed to Philadelphia, Pennsylvania, United States